Ann Patricia Bowling (born 7 May 1951) is a British and Irish sociologist and academic, specializing in research on ageing, quality of life, and research methods. Bowling developed the internationally recognized Older People's Quality of Life questionnaire (OPQOL).  Bowling was most recently Professor of Health Sciences, University of Southampton (2012–17), where she is now visiting professor.

Work
Previously Bowling was Professor of Ageing at St George's, University of London (2010–11), Professor of Health Services Research at University College London (1995–2010), Senior Lecturer promoted to Reader at Barts and The London School of Medicine and Dentistry (1986–1995) and joint Senior Lecturer at the London School of Hygiene & Tropical Medicine (1988–91), following several research posts.

Bowling's main work has focused on research and policy regarding quality of life in older age, and research methods in public health. She authored widely cited textbooks on research methods in public health Measuring Health: A Review of Quality of Life Measurement Scales and Research Methods in Health: Investigating Health and Health Services. Both have gone through four editions.

Bowling has been a member of various editorial boards, including the International Journal of Aging and Human Development.

Honours

In July 2006, Bowling was elected Fellow of the Faculty of Public Health, of the Royal College of Physicians of the United Kingdom. Measuring Health won Highly Commended in the Basis of Medicine section in the 1998 British Medical Association Medical Book Competition. Research Methods in Health won Highly Commended in Basis of Medicine section in the 2015 British Medical Association Medical Book Awards.

Selected works

Books

Journal articles

References

External links 

Older People’s Quality of Life Questionnaire (OPQOL) summed scoring and reverse coding
OPQOL-BRIEF questionnaire Links accessed 17 June 2018

1951 births
British sociologists
British women scientists
Fellows of the Royal College of Physicians
Living people
Academics of the University of Southampton
Academics of St George's, University of London
Academics of University College London
Academics of Barts and The London School of Medicine and Dentistry
Academics of the London School of Hygiene & Tropical Medicine
British women sociologists